The Netherlands participated in the Eurovision Song Contest 2006 with the song "Amambanda" written by Caroline Hoffman, Niña van Dijk and Djem van Dijk. The song was performed by the group Treble. The Dutch broadcaster Nederlandse Omroep Stichting (NOS) organised the national final Nationaal Songfestival 2006 in order to select the Dutch entry for the 2006 contest in Athens, Greece. Three artists competed in the national final on 12 March 2006 where the winner was selected over two rounds of voting. In the first round, each of the artists performed three songs and a nine-member jury panel selected one song per act to qualify to the second round. In the second round, "Amambanda" performed by Treble was selected as the winner exclusively by a public vote.

The Netherlands competed in the semi-final of the Eurovision Song Contest which took place on 18 May 2006. Performing during the show in position 17, "Amambanda" was not announced among top 10 entries of the semi-final and therefore did not qualify to compete in the final. It was later revealed that the Netherlands placed twentieth out of the 23 participating countries in the semi-final with 22 points.

Background 

Following the introduction of semi-finals for the 2004 contest, the Netherlands had featured in only one final. The Dutch least successful result has been last place, which they have achieved on four occasions, most recently in the 1968 contest.

The Dutch national broadcaster, Nederlandse Omroep Stichting (NOS), broadcast the event within the Netherlands and organises the selection process for the nation's entry. The Netherlands has used various methods to select the Dutch entry in the past, such as the Nationaal Songfestival, a live televised national final to choose the performer, song or both to compete at Eurovision. However, internal selections have also been held on occasion. Since 2003, NOS, in collaboration with broadcaster Televisie Radio Omroep Stichting (TROS), has organised Nationaal Songfestival in order to select the Dutch entry for the contest, a method that was continued for the 2006 Dutch entry but without the collaboration with TROS.

Before Eurovision

Nationaal Songfestival 2006 
Nationaal Songfestival 2006 was the national final developed by NOS that selected the Dutch entry for the Eurovision Song Contest 2006. Nine entries competed in the competition that consisted of a final on 12 March 2006 which took place at the Heineken Music Hall in Amsterdam, hosted by Paul de Leeuw. The show was broadcast on Nederland 2 as well as streamed online via the broadcaster's website nos.nl. The national final was watched by 1.26 million viewers in the Netherlands with a market share of 16.2%.

Format 
Three artists invited by NOS competed in the national final where the winner was selected over two rounds of voting. In the first round, each artist performed three candidate Eurovision songs and a ten-member jury selected one song for each act to proceed to the superfinal. In the superfinal, the winner was selected exclusively by public televoting. Nine of the jurors with voting rights awarded a point for their favourite song of each artist in the first round, while viewers were able to vote via telephone and SMS in the superfinal.

The jury panel consisted of:

 Glennis Grace – singer and 2005 Dutch Eurovision entrant
 Lange Frans – singer
 Floortje Dessing – presenter
 Ron Stoeltie – Radio 2 music director
 Fiona Heering – fashion journalist
 Henk Temming – composer
 Tasha's World – singer
 Jan Keizer – singer
 Giel Beelen – radio DJ
 Cornald Maas (non-voting) – journalist

Competing entries 
On 22 November 2005, the three selected competing artists were announced during a press conference that took place in Amsterdam. A submission period was opened on the same day where composers from or with a link to the Netherlands were able to submit their songs for the artists until 16 January 2006. 174 songs were received by the broadcaster at the closing of the deadline: 82 for Maud, 47 for Behave and 45 for Treble. Each of the artists selected three songs for the competition, two of them being self-provided and one of them from the open submissions in consultation with NOS and their record companies. The nine songs were announced on 15 February 2006.

Final 
The final took place on 12 March 2006. In the first round, each of the three acts performed their three candidate Eurovision songs and the votes of a nine-member expert jury selected one song per artist to proceed to the superfinal. In the superfinal, the winner, "Amambanda" performed by Treble, was selected exclusively by a public televote. 126,000 votes were cast by the public during the superfinal. In addition to the performances of the competing entries, the show featured a guest performance by the Greek dance group Evropi.

Promotion 
Treble specifically promoted "Amambanda" as the Dutch Eurovision entry by taking part in a six-week promotional tour where they performed at live events, radio shows and talk shows across Europe between March and May.

At Eurovision 
According to Eurovision rules, all nations with the exceptions of the host country, the "Big Four" (France, Germany, Spain and the United Kingdom) and the ten highest placed finishers in the 2005 contest are required to qualify from the semi-final on 18 May 2006 in order to compete for the final on 20 May 2006; the top ten countries from the semi-final progress to the final. On 21 March 2006, a special allocation draw was held which determined the running order for the semi-final and the Netherlands was set to perform in position 17, following the entry from Finland and before the entry from Lithuania.

The semi-final and the final was broadcast in the Netherlands on Nederland 2 with commentary by Cornald Maas and Paul de Leeuw as well as via radio on Radio 2 with commentary by Ron Stoeltie. The Dutch spokesperson, who announced the Dutch votes during the final, was Paul de Leeuw.

Voting 
Below is a breakdown of points awarded to the Netherlands and awarded by the Netherlands in the semi-final and grand final of the contest. The nation awarded its 12 points to Armenia in the semi-final and to Turkey in the final of the contest.

Points awarded to the Netherlands

Points awarded by the Netherlands

References

2006
Countries in the Eurovision Song Contest 2006
Eurovision